Forevermore is the second studio album by Filipino singer Juris, released on July 22, 2011 by Star Records in the Philippines in CD format and in digital download through iTunes and Amazon.com. It consists of 13 tracks including ten original OPM compositions and two Korean cover songs.

Background
Forevermore also includes an original composition of Juris called "Bliss" and four OPM cover songs including Side A original song "Forevermore". The album was placed number 2 upon release at nationwide sales in Odyssey Music and Videos chart and Astrovision/Astroplus report in the Philippines. It became number 1 after two months. The album won at the 24th Philippine Awit Awards for Album of the Year.

Track listing

 Track 2 "Forevermore" is originally by Side A from the album By Your Side
 Track 4 "Don't Say Goodbye" is originally by Pops Fernandez from the soundtrack of the film My Neighbor's Wife (2011)
 Track 7 "Sabihin Mo Lang" is originally by Regine Velasquez from the soundtrack of Kailangan Ko'y Ikaw
 Track 8 "Minsan Lang Kitang Iibigin" is originally by Ariel Rivera from the album Simple Lang
 Track 11 "If You and Me" is the English cover of the Korean song "If" by Taeyeon of Girls' Generation
 Track 12 "Wishes" is a cover of the original English version by Britt Savage; the Japanese version is "Hidamari No Uta" (:ja:ひだまりの詩) by Le Couple

References

See also
 Juris Official Site
 Twitter of Juris
 Facebook of Juris

Star Music albums
2011 albums
Juris Fernandez albums
Tagalog-language albums